State Street Bank and Trust Company, more commonly known as State Street Global Services or simply Global Services, is a subsidiary of State Street Corporation organized as a trust company based in Massachusetts specializing in services to mutual funds and their advisers, collective investment funds, corporate and public pension funds, insurance companies, operating companies and non-profit organizations. Global Services is the largest custodian bank in the world.

It also used to provide retail banking and commercial lending products until it sold off that division in 1999 to Citizens Financial Group, of Providence, Rhode Island. The retail banking and commercial lending units were sold for $350 million. Assets under administration (AuA) $7 trillion 2Q 2017.
 
State Street, and its sister company State Street Global Advisors (SSgA), which is a leading registered investment advisor, together comprise the principal operating companies within parent company State Street Corporation.

Operations

State Street provides core investment custody, hedge fund or investment/securities accounting, fund administration, securities finance and transfer agent services to institutional clients like those named above. It provides these services in North American cities including Boston, New York City, Kansas City, Toronto, and Irvine, California, and in many international financial centers such as London, Frankfurt, Munich, Cologne, Vienna, San Salvador, Hong Kong, Beijing, Dublin, Luxembourg, Jersey C.I. and Tokyo. It has recently outsourced or offshored parts of its operations to joint venture operations in Mumbai, Pune and Kraków in an effort to reduce labor costs and match competitor custodians and wall street firms following the same strategy.

State Street also provides "middle office" services such as trading operations and a California division provides reconciliation services to investment banks with the help of Syntel and HCL Technologies. State Street Syntel Services Private Limited (SSSSPL) is a joint venture entity that executes reconciliation for investment banks worldwide.

Historical data 
State Street Bank and Trust Company was the tenth largest bank at the end of 2008 as an individual bank. (Not including subsidiaries)

See also 
 State Street Bank v. Signature Financial Group (1998 U.S. patent law decision)

References

Banks based in Massachusetts